The Glencree German War Cemetery is located in the valley of Glencree, County Wicklow, Ireland. 

The cemetery was dedicated on 9 July 1961. There are 134 graves. Fifty-three are identified, 28 are unknown. Six bodies are those of World War I prisoners of war held by the British. Forty-six were German civilian detainees who were being shipped from Britain to Canada for internment when their ship,  was torpedoed by a German U-boat, off Tory Island, County Donegal, on July 1940. Dr Hermann Görtz, an Abwehr spy, is also buried there. Dr Görtz committed suicide after the war when he was informed he would be deported; he feared he would be handed over to the Soviet Union.

The graveyard is administered by the German War Graves Commission.

Alongside the German Cemetery, on the bank of the Glencree River, a Mass rock can be reached by a narrow riverside path.

References

External links

Glencree German Cemetery

German War Graves Commission
World War I cemeteries
World War II cemeteries